Human Waste is Suffocation's debut EP released by Relapse Records.
This was also the first CD ever to be released by Relapse. "Infecting The Crypts", "Mass Obliteration", 
and "Jesus Wept" were re-recorded on the following album, Effigy of the Forgotten. "Synthetically Revived" was also re-recorded on Pierced from Within and "Catatonia" was re-recorded for the Despise the Sun EP. The only track that has not been re-recorded is the title track, which was originally recorded for the demo Reincremated.

Human Waste was reissued in 2005 with two bonus tracks taken from the 1990 demo Reincremated (which are "Involuntary Slaughter" and "Reincremation").

Track listing

Personnel
 Frank Mullen - vocals
 Terrance Hobbs - lead guitar
 Doug Cerrito - rhythm guitar
 Josh Barohn - bass
 Mike Smith - drums

Production
 Conrad Ziarnink- engineer on reissue (tracks: 6 to 8)
 Paul Bagin - engineer on first press (tracks: 1 to 6), reissue (tracks: 1 to 7)
 Matthew F. Jacobson - executive producer
 Suffocation - producer
 Ron Spencer - artwork

References

Suffocation (band) albums
1991 debut EPs
Relapse Records EPs